Goodooga is a town in the Australian state of New South Wales in Brewarrina Shire on the eastern bank of the Bokhara River. It is near Brewarrina and Lightning Ridge, its closest neighbour.

The shire council has also built the 'Great Artesian Baths' on the northside of town, heated water pool from the Great Artesian Basin.  

History 
Yuwaalayaay (also known as Yuwalyai, Euahlayi, Yuwaaliyaay, Gamilaraay, Kamilaroi, Yuwaaliyaayi) is an Australian Aboriginal language spoken on Yuwaalayaay country. It is closely related to the Gamilaraay and Yuwaalaraay languages. The Yuwaalayaay language region includes the landscape within the local government boundaries of the Shire of Balonne, including the town of Dirranbandi as well as the border town of Goodooga extending to Walgett and the Narran Lakes in New South Wales.

Goodooga is an Aboriginal word meaning, according to some "yam". However it has been proposed that it derives from "guduu+ga", 'at the place of the Murray cod' [guduu], rather than "gudugaa", a species of yam.

Goodooga's newspaper is the Goodooga Flash.

Sport 

Goodooga's main sport is rugby league, the Goodooga Magpies or the Goodooga 'Newtown' Jets. 

The other sports played in town include netball, lawn bowls and basketball.

Population
According to the 2016 census of population, here were 247 people in Goodooga.
 Aboriginal and Torres Strait Islander people made up 74.4% of the population. 
 94.6% of people were born in Australia and 84.7% of people only spoke English at home. 
 The most common responses for religion was Catholic at 44.7%.

Gallery

Notes

References
Anna Ash et al., Gamilaraay, Yuwaalaraay and Yuwaalayaay Dictionary. IAD Press: Alice Springs, 2003.

Towns in New South Wales
Brewarrina Shire